The Treason Act 1540 (32 Hen.8 c.25) was an Act of the Parliament of England. Its short title was "An Act declaring the Dissolution of the King's pretensed Marriage with the Lady Anne of Cleves."

The Act confirmed that the marriage between King Henry VIII and Anne of Cleves was annulled. They had married on 6 January 1540, but Henry had had the marriage annulled on 9 July of the same year. The Act also made it high treason for anyone "by word or deed, to accept, take, judge, or believe the said marriage to be good, or to procure or do any thing to the repeal of this act."

References
Statutes at Large, vol. IV, Danby Pickering, Cambridge University Press, 1765.

See also
High treason in the United Kingdom
Treason Act

Treason in England
Acts of the Parliament of England (1485–1603)
1540 in law
1540 in England
Henry VIII